Mason City is a city and the county seat of Cerro Gordo County, Iowa, United States. The population was 27,338 in the 2020 census, a decline from 29,172 in the 2000 census.  The Mason City Micropolitan Statistical Area includes all of Cerro Gordo and Worth counties. It is commonly referred to as the "River City", as the city grew up centered on the Winnebago River.

History
The region around what would later be first called Shibboleth was a summer home to the Sioux and Winnebago nations. The first settlement that became Shibboleth was established in 1853 at the confluence of the Winnebago River and Calmus Creek. The town had several names: Shibboleth, Masonic Grove, and Masonville until  Mason City was adopted in 1855, in honor of a founder's son, Mason Long.

In 1854, John McMillin opened the first store, and Dr. Silas Card opened the first medical practice in the area. Lizzie Thompson established the first schoolhouse in a log cabin in 1856. The United States Post Office Department started service to the town in 1857. Mason City was named the county seat in 1858. In 1870, Mason City, Iowa was officially incorporated as a town with Darius B. Mason as the first mayor.

Musical heritage
Mason City is known for its musical heritage, consistently producing successful performers and educators. The city's "favorite son," Meredith Willson, grew up in Mason City and played in the Mason City Symphonic Band as a high school student. Willson's crowning achievement was the famous stage musical The Music Man. Many of the characters in it were based on people Willson knew from his childhood in Mason City. And it also features the Parker's Opera House.

Geography

Climate
Mason City has a warm-summer humid continental climate (Köppen: Dfb), bordering closely on the hot-summer variant.

Demographics

2010 census
As of the census of 2010, there were 28,079 people, 12,366 households, and 7,210 families living in the city. The racial makeup of the city was 93.8% White, 1.8% African American, 0.3% Native American, 0.9% Asian, 1.3% from other races, and 1.9% from two or more races. Hispanic or Latino of any race were 5.1% of the population.

There were 12,366 households, of which 26.8% had children under the age of 18 living with them, 43.2% were married couples living together, 10.8% had a female householder with no husband present, 4.3% had a male householder with no wife present, and 41.7% were non-families. Of all households, 35.0% were made up of individuals, and 13.4% had someone living alone who was 65 years of age or older. The average household size was 2.20 and the average family size was 2.83.

The median age in the city was 40.9 years. 21.9% of residents were under the age of 18; 9.7% were between the ages of 18 and 24; 23.1% were from 25 to 44; 28.2% were from 45 to 64, and 17.1% were 65 years of age or older. The gender makeup of the city was 48.2% male and 51.8% female.

2000 census
As of the census of 2000, there were 29,172 people, 12,368 households, and 7,507 families living in the city. The racial makeup of the city was 95.40% White, 1.17% African American, 0.18% Native American, 0.77% Asian, 0.01% Pacific Islander, 1.07% from other races, and 1.40% from two or more races. Hispanic or Latino of any race were 3.45% of the population.

There were 12,368 households, out of which 28.4% had children under the age of 18 living with them, 47.4% were married couples living together, 10.3% had a female householder with no husband present, and 39.3% were non-families. Of all households, 33.5% were made up of individuals, and 14.6% had someone living alone who was 65 years of age or older. The average household size was 2.27 and the average family size was 2.90.

In the city the population was spread out, with 23.6% under the age of 18, 10.2% from 18 to 24, 26.7% from 25 to 44, 21.7% from 45 to 64, and 17.9% who were 65 years of age or older. The median age was 38 years. For every 100 females, there were 90.0 males. For every 100 females age 18 and over, there were 85.8 males.

The median income for a household in the city was $33,852, and the median income for a family was $45,160. Males had a median income of $32,451 versus $21,756 for females. The per capita income for the city was $18,899. About 7.2% of families and 10.0% of the population were below the poverty line, including 10.9% of those under age 18 and 10.1% of those age 65 or over.

Economy
Mason City has a very diverse employment base covering multiple sectors of the economy including Manufacturing, Health, Financial Services, Technology and Education, with no one sector or employer dominating the market.

The largest employer is MercyOne North Iowa Medical Center, formerly known as Mercy Medical Center-North Iowa, and before that as St. Joseph Mercy Hospital, is the region's largest hospital. The facility serves 14 counties across northern Iowa. In June 2019, the hospital opened a new $10.6 million behavioral center. The new center will help MercyOne to increase the number of behavioral health-care services it can offer to those in the community it serves who are struggling with mental illness and substance abuse issues.

Other major employers include door manufacturer Curries/Graham Company, Woodhardbor Cabinetry Manufacturers, Principal Financial, Cargill Kitchen Solutions and the Kraft Foods plant that produces the nation's entire supply of refrigerated ready-to-eat Jell-O pudding snacks. Mason City is also a major production center for Portland Cement. In November 2007, Reyes Holding / Martin-Brower opened a distribution facility serving McDonald's in 5 states.

In March 2016, North Carolina based company Prestage Farms proposed to build a $240 million pork processing plant or slaughterhouse in Mason City, employing about 1,800 people. In May, the Mason City Council cast a tie vote rejecting the proposed project. Plant opponents raised environmental issues and expressed concern about possible harm to property values.

Arts and culture
The Charles H. MacNider Art Museum includes a permanent collection of American art, the famous Bil Baird puppets, and a wide range of ceramics.

Music Man Square is located near downtown and features multiple exhibits related to Meredith Willson and The Music Man, including Willson's boyhood home, the Meredith Willson Museum, and a replica streetscape from the musical.

Events and festivals

In late May or early June Mason City holds an annual celebration of its musical heritage called The North Iowa Band Festival. School bands from across the Midwest compete during the parade to be named the best band. The home bands, Mason City High School and Newman Catholic High School Marching Bands, do not compete but do perform in the parade. Meredith Willson returned to participate in the festival many times.

Landmarks

 Architecture and the Prairie School
Mason City is widely known for its collection of Prairie School architecture. The Rock Crest-Rock Glen Historic District is the largest concentration of any city in Iowa. At least 32 houses and one commercial building were built in the Prairie Style between 1908 and 1922, 17 of which are listed on the National Register of Historic Places and eight more are contributing properties to a historic district.

The first two Prairie structures, the Dr. G.C. Stockman House (1908) and the Park Inn Hotel and City National Bank Buildings (1909–1910) were both designed by Frank Lloyd Wright. The hotel and bank, a mixed-use development at the corner of State and Federal Avenues was the first to be commissioned by local attorneys James E. E. Markley and James E. Blythe. Within a year, Wright was hired to design the Stockman House by Markley's neighbor.

Both the Park Inn Hotel and Stockman House suffered from neglect and unsympathetic alterations before they were saved by community organizations. In 1989, the Stockman House was moved four blocks to prevent its demolition; it was subsequently restored and opened to the public by the River City Society for Historic Preservation. Likewise, Wright on the Park, Inc. began restoration on the Park Inn Hotel in 2005 and the former City National Bank building in 2007. The organization reopened both buildings as a boutique hotel in August 2011. The Park Inn Hotel is last remaining of the few hotels that Wright completed during his career and is considered a prototype for Wright's Imperial Hotel.

The Rock Glen and Rock Crest National Historic district is a small enclave of single-family homes situated along the banks of Willow Creek five blocks east of downtown. It is the largest collection of prairie-style homes in a natural setting in the world. It features both Prairie School and Usonian design. Five of these houses were designed by Walter Burley Griffin and Marion Mahony Griffin, two by Francis Barry Byrne, and others by William Drummond, Einar Broaten, and Curtis Besinger.

In addition to Prairie Style architecture, Mason City is home to extensive Victorian, Craftsman, and Bungalow style homes, as well as historic commercial structures, dates from between 1892 and 1940, including the Brick and Tile Building at the intersection of State and Delaware Streets.

The Mason City Public Library was designed by Chicago architects Holabird and Root in 1939.

The Len Jus Building on North Federal Avenue has an extremely rare sheet-metal facade, it had been placed on the Iowa Historic Preservation Alliance's Most Endangered list because of its poor repair and indifferent ownership, but is now being rehabilitated by the new owner.

Sports
Mason City has some history of minor league and amateur sports teams despite its relatively small size.

The North Iowa Bulls are a junior ice hockey team that first began play in the 2011 as member of the North American 3 Hockey League (NA3HL). The Bulls won the league championship in 2013, 2014, 2016, and 2021, while also winning the Tier III National Championship in 2013 and 2015. The Bulls moved up to the Tier II North American Hockey League (NAHL) and rebranded the Tier III team as the Mason City Toros in 2021. The North Iowa Outlaws junior hockey team previously played in the NAHL from 2005 until 2010, when they relocated to Onalaska, Wisconsin, to become the Coulee Region Chill. The North Iowa Huskies played in the United States Hockey League from 1983 to 1999 and then moved the Cedar Rapids.

Mason City was home to minor league baseball. The Mason City Cementmakers (1912) and Mason City Claydiggers (1915-1917) played as  members of the Iowa State League (1912) and Central Association (1915–1917). The teams played at Hanford Park.

The Mason City Bats of the short-lived Great Central League played baseball here in 1994.

College Football Hall of Fame coach Barry Alvarez led Mason City High School to the 1978 Class 4A state football championship with a 15–13 victory over Dubuque Hempstead.

River City Rugby Football Club was established in Mason City in 1972. The Club competes in two separate two-month seasons, April and May, and September and October. The Club celebrated its 40th anniversary in June 2012. Over 250 players have played for the Club since it first began. The Club competes against teams from Iowa, Minnesota, and Nebraska in the Midwest Division 3.

Education

Primary and secondary schools
Mason City Community School District operates the following schools:
Harding Elementary School,
Hoover Elementary School,
Jefferson Elementary School,
Roosevelt Elementary School,
Lincoln Intermediate School (5–6),
John Adams Junior High School (7–8),
Mason City High School, (9–12),
Mason City Alternative High School,
Madison Early Childhood Center. Past schools include Lincoln, Washington, Grant and Garfield elementary schools, and Monroe and Roosevelt junior high schools.

Newman Catholic Elementary/Middle School, Newman Catholic High School, and North Iowa Christian School. Mason City is also the home of the Worldwide College of Auctioning founded in 1933 by the well-known auctioneer Col. Joe Reisch and subsequently owned/operated for many years by Col. Gordon E. Taylor.

Postsecondary education
Mason City is home to several institutions of higher education, including the North Iowa Area Community College (formerly Mason City Junior College), a branch of Buena Vista University which is located on the NIACC campus, and Purdue University Global formerly known as Kaplan University. Hamilton College, a business school, has operated in the city since 1900.

Media

Movies and documentaries
The town is featured prominently in the first episode of the 12-part documentary film How Democracy Works Now.  In the 1989 movie UHF the character Stanley Spadowski (played by Michael Richards) is seen wearing a Mason City t-shirt.

Mason City served as the inspiration for the fictional town of River City, Iowa, in  The Music Man, a musical that was composed and written by Mason City native son Meredith Willson (although the 1962 film, which had its world premiere in Mason City, was shot entirely at Warner Bros. Studios in Burbank, California).

Television

Radio

Newspapers
 Globe Gazette – daily newspaper

Infrastructure

Surface transportation
The majority of Mason City is served by Iowa Highway 122 and U.S. Route 65. U.S. Route 18 now bypasses the city to the south. Interstate 35 (eight miles to the west) serves the city as well.

Rail service
Mason City is home to the Iowa Traction Railway. The IATR is one of the last surviving electric interurban railroads in the U. S., and the only one that still uses electric locomotives to haul freight in regular service.

Mason City also is served by the Canadian Pacific Railway and Union Pacific Railroad. The Canadian Pacific track is part of its US subsidiary the Dakota, Minnesota and Eastern Railroad ( former I&M Rail Link and Milwaukee Road trackage. The Union Pacific's track was inherited from the Chicago and North Western Transportation Company when it bought it in the 1990s. Much of the trackage is composed of the old Chicago, Rock Island, and Pacific Railroad's (aka Rock Island Railroad )

While the Iowa Northern Railway does not operate in the city of Mason City, it does serve other communities in the Mason City micropolitan statistical area. The Iowa Northern has facilities in Manly, Iowa.

Airports
The city also hosts Mason City Municipal Airport, (MCW) with commercial service by United Airlines. It is the airport from which early rock and roll stars Buddy Holly, Ritchie Valens and The Big Bopper (J.P. Richardson) took off on the night of February 3, 1959, after a concert at the Surf Ballroom in nearby Clear Lake, Iowa, en route to Fargo, N.D. The plane crashed a few miles west of the airport in an historic event later referred to as the Day the Music Died. Holly, Valens, Richardson and pilot Roger Peterson all died in the accident.

Notable people

Barry Alvarez, former head football coach and athletic director at Wisconsin
Todd Blodgett, Member of White House staff (Reagan-Bush) 1985-87. Served on Bush-Quayle '88 campaign committee. Also worked with the FBI.
 Bil Baird, puppeteer
 Charles F. Barlow, pediatric neurologist
 Carrie Chapman Catt, woman's suffrage
 Don Eddy, MLB pitcher, raised in Swaledale but born in Mason City
 Tanna Frederick, actress
 Walter Burley Griffin, architect
 Jodi Huisentruit, anchorwoman and missing person
 Jack Jenney, jazz musician
 Richard Kirkham, philosopher
 Tim Lannon (born 1951), Creighton University President
 Tim Laudner, Major League Baseball catcher
 Sandra Levinson, executive director and co-founder of the Center for Cuban Studies
 Joe Lillard, NFL running back
 Hanford MacNider (1889–1968), Ambassador to Canada, Brigadier-General in the US Army
 James J. Montague (1873–1941), journalist and poet
 Sonny Onoo, professional wrestling manager
 Jack Rule, Jr., professional golfer
 Scott Sandage (born 1964), historian and author
 Frank Secory, MLB left fielder and umpire
 Ralph Senensky, television director and writer
 Meredith Willson, composer and playwright, The Music Man

Sister city
Mason City, Iowa, and Montegrotto Terme, Italy, created a Sister City relationship in the spring of 2005. This relationship creates a bridge between the two cities that citizens can use to build new and lasting friendships and relationships.

See also

 MacNider Art Museum
 Collaborative Summer Library Program

References

External links
 

 Mason City Iowa The original River City Portal style website including city government.
 Mason City Chamber of Commerce
 Mason City Public Library website
 Visit Mason City Visitor information for Mason City and surrounding area.

 
Cities in Cerro Gordo County, Iowa
Cities in Iowa
County seats in Iowa
1853 establishments in Iowa